was a  after Jōkyō and before Hōei. The Genroku period spanned the years from the ninth month of 1688 to the third month of 1704.
  
The period was known for its peace and prosperity, as the previous hundred years of peace and seclusion in Japan had created relative economic stability. The arts and architecture flourished. There were unanticipated consequences when the shogunate debased the quality of coins as a strategy for financing the appearance of continuing Genroku affluence. This strategic miscalculation caused abrupt inflation. Then, in an effort to solve the ensuing crisis, the  introduced what were called the Kyōhō Reforms.

Change of era
The  was 1688. The new era name was created to mark the beginning of the reign of Higashiyama. The previous era ended and the new one commenced in Jōkyō 5, on the 30th day of the 9th month.

A sense of optimism is suggested in the era name choice of Genroku (meaning "original happiness").

Events of the Genroku era

 1688 (Genroku 1, 1st month):  Ihara Saikaku publishes Japan's Eternal Treasury.
 1688 (Genroku 1, 11th month): Yanagisawa Yoshiyasu assumes the office of 
 1688 (Genroku 1): The Tokugawa shogunate revised the code of conduct for funerals, which incorporated a code of conduct for mourning as well.
 1689 (Genroku 2, 4th month): Foreign settlements in Nagasaki become possible.
 September 16, 1689 (Genroku 2, 3rd day of the 7th month): German physician Engelbert Kaempfer arrives at Dejima.
 1690 (Genroku 3, 10th month): The Abandoned Child Ban was officially proclaimed.
 1692 (Genroku 5): Building of temples in Edo banned.
 1693 (Genroku 6): The code of conduct for funerals is revised again.
 1695 (Genroku 8, 8th month): Minting begun of Genroku coinage. There is no connection between those uses, however.
 1695 (Genroku 8, 11th month): First kennel is established for stray dogs in Edo. In this context, Tokugawa Tsunayoshi comes to be nicknamed "the Dog ".

 1697 (Genroku 10): The fourth official map of Japan was made in this year, but it was considered to be inferior to the previous one—which had been ordered in Shōhō 1 (1605) and completed in Kan'ei 16 (1639). This map was corrected in Kyōhō 4 (1719) by the mathematician Tatebe Katahiro (1644–1739), using high mountain peaks as points of reference, and was drawn to a scale of 1:21,600.
 1697 (Genroku 10): Great fire in Edo.
 1698 (Genroku 11): Another great fire in Edo. A new hall is constructed inside the enclosure of the Edo temple of Kan'ei-ji (which is also known as Tōeizan Kan'ei-ji or "Hiei-san of the east" after the temple of Enryaku-ji at Mount Hiei near to Heian-kyō).
 1700 (Genroku 13, 11th month): Exchange rate of silver coins established.
 1703 (Genroku 15, 12th month): Akō Domain incident involving the 47 .
 1703 (Genroku 16, 3rd month): Ōishi Yoshio commits ritual suicide.
 1703 (Genroku 16, 5th month): First performance of Chikamatsu Monzaemon's play The Love Suicides at Sonezaki.
 December 31, 1703 (Genroku 16, 23rd day of the 11th month): The Great Genroku earthquake shook Edo and parts of the shogun's castle collapsed. The following day, a vast fire spread throughout the city. Parts of Honshū's coast were battered by tsunami, and up to 200,000 people were either killed or injured.

Prominent figures of the Genroku era
Chikamatsu Monzaemon— playwright
Ichikawa Danjūrō I, Sakata Tōjūrō I, Yoshizawa Ayame I—kabuki actors
Ihara Saikaku—novelist
Arai Hakuseki—Confucian scholar and shogunal advisor
The Forty-seven 
Ogata Kōrin and Ogata Kenzan—Rinpa school artists
Torii Kiyonobu, Hishikawa Moronobu, Miyagawa Chōshun—ukiyo-e artists
Matsuo Bashō—Haiku poet

See also
Genroku culture

Notes

References
 Hammer, Joshua. (2006). Yokohama Burning: The Deadly 1923 Earthquake and Fire that Helped Forge the Path to World War II. New York: Simon & Schuster. ;  OCLC 67774380
 Nussbaum, Louis Frédéric and Käthe Roth. (2005). Japan Encyclopedia. Cambridge: Harvard University Press. ; OCLC 48943301
 Screech, Timon. (2006). Secret Memoirs of the Shoguns: Isaac Titsingh and Japan, 1779–1822. London: RoutledgeCurzon. ; OCLC 65177072
 Smith, Robert John and Richard K. Beardsley. (2004). Japanese Culture: Its Development And Characteristics. London: Routledge. 
 Titsingh, Isaac. (1834). Nihon Ōdai Ichiran; ou,  Annales des empereurs du Japon.  Paris: Royal Asiatic Society, Oriental Translation Fund of Great Britain and Ireland. OCLC 5850691.
 Traganeou, Jilly. (2004). The Metaphorical Road of the Tōkaid: Traveling and Representation in Edo and Meiji Japan. London: RoutledgeCurzon. ;  OCLC 52347509

External links
 National Diet Library, "The Japanese Calendar" -- historical overview plus illustrative images from library's collection
 New York Public Library Digital Gallery, Engelbert Kaempfer's 1691 impression of Hōkō-ji compound (published 1727)

Japanese eras
1680s in Japan
1690s in Japan
1700s in Japan